is a 1995 Japanese kaiju film directed by Takao Okawara. Produced and distributed by Toho Studios, it is the 22nd installment in the Godzilla franchise, and is the seventh and final film in the franchise's Heisei period. The film features the fictional monster characters Godzilla, Godzilla Junior and Destoroyah, and stars  Takuro Tatsumi, Yōko Ishino, Yasufumi Hayashi, Sayaka Osawa, Megumi Odaka, Masahiro Takashima, Momoko Kochi and Akira Nakao, with Kenpachiro Satsuma as Godzilla, Hurricane Ryu as Godzilla Junior, and Ryo Hariya as Destoroyah.

In the film, Godzilla's heart, which acts as a nuclear reactor, is nearing a nuclear meltdown which threatens the Earth. Meanwhile, a colony of mutated creatures known as Destoroyah emerge from the sea, changing form and terrorizing Japan, forcing the Japanese Self-Defense Forces to devise a plan to eliminate both threats.

Godzilla vs. Destoroyah received global publicity following an announcement by Toho that the film would feature the death of Godzilla. It was the final film to be scored by composer Akira Ifukube before his death in 2006, though his themes would continue to be used in subsequent films. The film was released theatrically in Japan on December 9, 1995, and received a direct-to-video release in the United States in 1999 by Columbia TriStar Home Video. It was the last Godzilla film to be produced by any studio until the 1998 film, and was the last Godzilla film produced by Toho until the 1999 film Godzilla 2000.

Plot
In 1996, following the defeat of SpaceGodzilla, Miki Saegusa of the United Nations Godzilla Countermeasures Center (UNGCC) travels to Birth Island to monitor Godzilla and Little Godzilla, only to find the entire island destroyed and both monsters missing. Godzilla, now covered in lava-like rashes, subsequently appears in Hong Kong and destroys great swathes of the city with an empowered version of his atomic breath. The JSDF hires college student Kenkichi Yamane to unravel the mystery of Godzilla's condition. Yamane, a grandson of the same Dr. Kyohei Yamane who had encountered the first Godzilla, suspects that Godzilla's heart, which acts as a nuclear reactor, is undergoing a nuclear meltdown as a result of the monster absorbing the energy released from a volcanically triggered uranium deposit on Birth Island. Yamane theorizes that when Godzilla's temperature reaches 1,200 °C, he will explode with enough energy to ignite Earth's atmosphere and reduce the planet's surface to ash.

The JSDF deploys the Super X III, an aerial combat vehicle outfitted with ultra-low temperature lasers, in an attempt to reverse Godzilla's self-destruction. While Godzilla's meltdown is not stopped, it is halted long enough to temporarily render Godzilla unconscious. Meanwhile, a colony of Precambrian organisms mutated by the Oxygen Destroyer used to defeat the original Godzilla are awoken during the construction of the Tokyo Bay Aqua Line. The creatures combine into several man-sized crab-like creatures and engage the JSDF in several deadly skirmishes. The creatures, dubbed "Destoroyah", are revealed to be vulnerable to subzero temperatures, and are temporarily held at bay with low-temperature lasers. The creatures respond to the threat by merging into a larger Aggregate form which destroys the lasers and takes to the skies in its Flying form.

Godzilla awakens, his condition having worsened to the point that his meltdown could potentially destroy the planet through a China syndrome-like incident. Miki locates Little Godzilla - renamed Godzilla Junior on account of his increased size - and telepathically lures him to Tokyo, hoping that Godzilla will follow and be killed by Destoroyah. Junior arrives and battles Destoroyah's Aggregate form, who absorbs his DNA before being seemingly defeated. Godzilla arrives at Haneda Airport and reunites with Godzilla Junior, only for Destoroyah, bolstered by Junior's DNA, to reappear in its final, Perfect form. Destoroyah kills Junior by dropping him onto Ariake Coliseum and blasting it with his Micro-Oxygen beam. Godzilla manages to drive off his adversary and unsuccessfully attempts to revive Junior.

Godzilla's bereavement accelerates his meltdown, which is further worsened by a second attack by Destoroyah. In the ensuing battle, Godzilla loses control over his radioactivity and gravely wounds Destoroyah with a further empowered heat ray. Destoroyah tries to retreat, but the JSDF fires its low-temperature lasers at its wings, causing it to plummet onto the superheated ground and dissipate.

Godzilla succumbs to the meltdown, but the JSDF is able to minimize the damage with it freezer weapons. While successful in preventing Earth's destruction, the JSDF is unable to prevent the resulting nuclear fallout from rendering Tokyo uninhabitable. Suddenly, the radiation levels plummet and Godzilla Junior is revealed to have absorbed his father's radiation and grown into an adult.

Cast

Production

After Godzilla vs. Mechagodzilla II and Godzilla vs. SpaceGodzilla failed to match the attendance figures of the highly successful Godzilla vs. Mothra, producer Shogo Tomiyama announced in the summer of 1995 that the next Godzilla movie would be the series' final installment. Screenwriter Kazuki Ōmori initially proposed a story treatment entitled Godzilla vs. Ghost Godzilla, in which the current Heisei Godzilla would have faced off against the ghost of the original 1954 Godzilla. While this idea was scrapped, it was decided to maintain the reference to the original film by reintroducing the Oxygen Destroyer, the weapon that killed the original Godzilla 40 years earlier. In the original script, the final battle was to have taken place in the then still under construction World City, a development project costing $2.35 billion, though Tokyo governor Yukio Aoshima scrapped the project on account of its unpopularity with taxpayers. Toho began promoting the movie via large placards featuring the kanji text ゴジラ死す ("Godzilla dies").

Five days prior to the film's release, a large bronze sculpture of Godzilla was erected on the Hibiya cinema district. After the film's release, Toho studios was bombarded by letters of protest demanding Godzilla's resurrection, and several mourners gathered at the bronze statue to leave ¥10-100 coins and tobacco. One Japanese travel agency commemorated Godzilla's demise by hosting tours of various locations destroyed by Godzilla throughout its 40-year tenure. Toho representatives assured the public that Godzilla's death was not permanent, though they were not planning to revive him until the 21st century due to TriStar Pictures' plans to adapt the character in a film trilogy. However, after the first film was poorly received, Toho returned to the series in 1999 with the first film of the "Millennium Era", Godzilla 2000: Millennium.

Special effects
Effects artist Koichi Kawakita originally envisioned Godzilla being luminescent, and coated a Godzilla suit with luminescent paint and reflective tape, though this was deemed to look too unnatural. The final product was the result of placing 200 small orange light bulbs on the suit previously used for Godzilla vs. SpaceGodzilla and covering them with semitransparent vinyl plates. The resulting suit proved difficult for suit actor Kenpachiro Satsuma to perform in, as the cable powering the light bulbs added extra weight to the suit, and the carbonic acid gas emitted by the costume nearly suffocated him six times. For Godzilla's confrontation with the Super-X III, the now-expendable suit previously used for Godzilla vs. Mechagodzilla II was used, as it was predicted that it would have suffered irreparable damage from the liquid nitrogen used during the scene.

Godzilla Junior and Destoroyah were also portrayed via traditional suitmation techniques, though because the Junior suit was almost the same size as the main Godzilla one, a small animatronic prop was used in scenes where Junior interacts with its father. During the scene where the JSDF bombards the immature Destoroyahs, the creatures were realized with Bandai action figures. Kawakita made greater use of CGI than in previous installments, having used it for the Super-X III's freezing of Godzilla, shots showing helicopters, computer schematics showing the outcome of Godzilla's meltdown, and Godzilla's death.

Music
Composer Akira Ifukube, who had previously declined to compose the score of Godzilla vs. SpaceGodzilla, agreed to work on Godzilla vs. Destoroyah'''s soundtrack since he "felt that since [he had] been involved in Godzilla's birth, it was fitting for [him] to be involved in his death." For Destoroyah's theme, Ifukube had initially wanted to give each of Destoroyah's forms their own motif, though he subsequently chose to give them all the same theme. He chose not to use the Oxygen Destroyer theme from the original 1954 film, as he felt that the theme expressed the tragedy of the weapon's creator, and thus was inappropriate for a monster. He also deliberately avoided using Godzilla's death theme from the original film, as he wanted to focus more on the dark side of humanity rather than on Godzilla itself. In describing his composition of Godzilla's death theme, he stated that it was one of the most difficult pieces he had ever composed, and that he approached it as if he were writing the theme to his own death.

English version

After the film was released in Japan, Toho commissioned a Hong Kong company to dub the film into English. In this international version of the movie, an English title card was superimposed over the Japanese title, as had been done with the previous 1990s Godzilla films.

Columbia TriStar Home Entertainment released Godzilla vs. SpaceGodzilla and Godzilla vs. Destoroyah on home video on January 19, 1999, the first time that either film had been officially released in the United States. TriStar used the Toho dubs, but cut the end credits and created new titles and opening credits for both films, which included subtitling the film's title. The complete Toho international version of Godzilla vs. Destoroyah has been broadcast on several premium movie channels since the early 2000s.

Merchandise
Various video games based on the film were released, all published by Sega and released in 1995. Godzilla: Kaijuu no Daishingeki for Sega Game Gear, Godzilla: Heart-Pounding Monster Island for Sega Pico, and Godzilla: Rettoushinkan for Sega Saturn.Rettoushinkan was well known for being a first real-time tactics video game to be released on 32-Bit Consoles, by 11 month before the PlayStation port of Warhammer: Shadow of the Horned Rat. as well as the only real-time tactics video game for the system, as the Sega Saturn version of Syndicate Wars was being cancelled in March 1997, with Bullfrog's head of conversions, Steve Metcalf, explaining that the Saturn market was not large enough to cover development costs.

Reception
Box office
It earned ¥2 billion in distribution income (around ). It was the number one domestic film at the box office in Japan by distribution income for 1996 and Fourth Place overall behind Twister, SE7EN and Mission: Impossible.

Critical reception
Critical and fan reaction to the film has been very positive. Toho Kingdom said, "With an elegant style, a powerful plot, brilliant effects, and believable acting, this entry is definitely a notch above favorites from all three timelines, and its impact on the series is challenged by only a handful of competitors." Michael Hubert of Monster Zero praised the "spectacular monster battles", adding: "Even for non-Godzilla fans, this movie might help dispel some of the preconceptions you have about Godzilla's 'cheese factor'." Japan Hero called the film "a work of art" and "a must see for anyone who loves Godzilla" that features "something for everyone".

Stomp Kaiju gave the film a score of 4 out of 5, saying "This is one of the biggest productions the big G ever had. The new Super-X III, looking black and stealth-bombery, is a great addition, and the return of Lt. Sho Kuroki (Masashiro Takashima) from Godzilla vs Biollante as its pilot is a nice touch [...] It's nice to see a company handle its property, beloved by millions, with a little respect and knowledge of that property's history." Tim Brayton of Alternate Ending called it "A Godzilla movie of particular grandeur and seriousness", saying "it's the best Godzilla film of the VS era: visually robust, focused on great heaving gestures and emotions that work so much better in this franchise than the attempts at human-scaled storytelling that some of the more recent sequels gestured towards."

Mike Bogue of American Kaiju felt the film suffered from "several visual weaknesses" and a "disappointing editing", but that "the positive aspects of the visuals outweigh the negatives", and praised the film for "treating Godzilla with the same awe, majesty, and terror as the original 1954 Godzilla." A mixed review came from DVD Talk, saying that "Although it benefits from having an honest-to-goodness storyline with some continuity from the previous Godzillas (going back to the earliest films), Destoroyah's portentous pacing, cardboard-thin characters and cheeseball effects apparently served as a primer on what not to do when Hollywood picked up the franchise."

Awards

Home media
The film has been released on DVD by Columbia/Tristar Home Entertainment on February 1, 2000 along with Godzilla vs. SpaceGodzilla.

It was released on blu-ray in The Toho Godzilla Collection  by Sony on May 6, 2014 along with Godzilla vs. Megaguirus''.

Notes

References

Bibliography

External links

 
 
 
 
 Godzilla vs. Destoroyah on Wikizilla

1990s monster movies
1995 films
1995 science fiction films
1990s Japanese-language films
Apocalyptic films
Films about telepathy
Films directed by Takao Okawara
Films produced by Tomoyuki Tanaka
Films scored by Akira Ifukube
Films set in 1996
Films set in airports
Films set in Hong Kong
Films set in Ibaraki Prefecture
Films set in Japan
Films set in the Pacific Ocean
Films set in Tokyo
Films set on islands
Giant monster films
Godzilla films
Japanese science fiction films
Japanese sequel films
Kaiju films
Toho films
TriStar Pictures films
Films about father–son relationships
1990s Japanese films